The Oakland Athletics' 1996 season was the team's 29th in Oakland, California. It was also the 96th season in franchise history. The team finished third in the American League West with a record of 78-84.

The 1996 season was the Athletics' first under manager Art Howe. It was also the team's fourth consecutive losing season. The reasons behind Oakland's mediocrity remained the same; a below-average offense failed to offset an awful pitching staff. The Athletics' starting rotation, once again, was in shambles; none of the Athletics' six primary starters (Don Wengert, Doug Johns, John Wasdin, Ariel Prieto, Steve Wojciechowski, and Dave Telgheder) managed to win more than eight games. Oakland's bullpen also ranked among the league's worst. Reliever Carlos Reyes lead all pitchers in strikeouts with 78.  All told, the A's boasted a team ERA of 5.20; this was the 10th best total in the 14-team American League.

The Athletics' offense was only slightly better. As had been the case in prior years, slugger Mark McGwire was the main draw; he crushed a league-high (and Oakland franchise record) 52 home runs in 1996. Designated hitter Gerónimo Berroa and catcher Terry Steinbach belted 36 and 35 home runs, respectively; secondary hitters Scott Brosius, Jason Giambi, and Ernie Young contributed 22, 20, and 19. The Athletics, as a team, hit 243 home runs (the American League's third-most); a low team batting average, however, ensured that they would finish the season with only 861 runs (the American League's 10th best total).

The Athletics hovered around the .500-mark for almost all of the season. They were not expected to contend in 1996, and indeed did not; they ultimately finished 12 games behind the first-time AL West Champion Texas Rangers.

Offseason
November 27, 1995: Buddy Groom was signed as a free agent with the Oakland Athletics.
December 5, 1995: Torey Lovullo was signed as a free agent with the Oakland Athletics.
January 22, 1996: Danny Tartabull was traded by the Oakland Athletics to the Chicago White Sox for Andrew Lorraine and Charles Poe (minors).
January 22, 1996: Rafael Bournigal was signed as a free agent with the Oakland Athletics.
January 29, 1996: Aaron Small was selected off waivers by the Oakland Athletics from the Seattle Mariners.
 January 29, 1996: Pedro Munoz was signed as a free agent with the Oakland Athletics.
 February 13, 1996: Dennis Eckersley was traded by the Oakland Athletics to the St. Louis Cardinals for Steve Montgomery.
 March 10, 1996: Webster Garrison was signed as a free agent with the Oakland Athletics.

Regular season

Season standings

Record vs. opponents

Game log

|- bgcolor="ffbbbb"
| 1 || April 1 || Blue Jays || 6–9 || Hanson || Reyes (0–1) || Timlin || 7,294 || 0–1
|- bgcolor="ffbbbb"
| 2 || April 3 || Blue Jays || 4–10 || Hentgen || Prieto (0–1) || — || 8,050 || 0–2
|- bgcolor="ffbbbb"
| 3 || April 4 || Tigers || 9–10 (15) || Keagle || Small (0–1) || — || 8,346 || 0–3
|- bgcolor="ccffcc"
| 4 || April 5 || Tigers || 13–2 || Johns (1–0) || Gohr || — || 11,149 || 1–3
|- bgcolor="ffbbbb"
| 5 || April 6 || Tigers || 1–6 || Lira || Reyes (0–2) || — || 10,424 || 1–4
|- bgcolor="ccffcc"
| 6 || April 7 || Tigers || 7–6 || Corsi (1–0) || Williams || — || 9,723 || 2–4
|- bgcolor="ffbbbb"
| 7 || April 9 || @ Brewers || 4–10 || McDonald || Van Poppel (0–1) || — || 42,090 || 2–5
|- bgcolor="ccffcc"
| 8 || April 11 || @ Brewers || 11–0 || Johns (2–0) || Karl || — || 12,236 || 3–5
|- bgcolor="ccffcc"
| 9 || April 12 || @ White Sox || 7–2 || Reyes (1–2) || Fernandez || — || 13,623 || 4–5
|- bgcolor="ffbbbb"
| 10 || April 13 || @ White Sox || 5–6 (12) || Karchner || Wengert (0–1) || — || 15,812 || 4–6
|- bgcolor="ccffcc"
| 11 || April 14 || @ White Sox || 10–5 || Groom (1–0) || Simas || — || 15,236 || 5–6
|- bgcolor="ccffcc"
| 12 || April 15 || @ Rangers || 8–3 || Mohler (1–0) || Heredia || — || 19,312 || 6–6
|- bgcolor="ffbbbb"
| 13 || April 16 || @ Rangers || 3–5 || Witt || Johns (2–1) || Henneman || 20,948 || 6–7
|- bgcolor="ffbbbb"
| 14 || April 17 || @ Rangers || 1–12 || Hill || Reyes (1–3) || — || 24,120 || 6–8
|- bgcolor="ffbbbb"
| 15 || April 19 || White Sox || 3–4 || Karchner || Briscoe (0–1) || Hernandez || 31,320 || 6–9
|- bgcolor="ffbbbb"
| 16 || April 20 || White Sox || 3–8 || Tapani || Van Poppel (0–2) || — || 16,480 || 6–10
|- bgcolor="ccffcc"
| 17 || April 21 || White Sox || 6–5 || Corsi (2–0) || Simas || Mohler (1) || 16,125 || 7–10
|- bgcolor="ccffcc"
| 18 || April 22 || Brewers || 6–2 || Reyes (2–3) || Bones || Briscoe (1) || 6,021 || 8–10
|- bgcolor="ccffcc"
| 19 || April 23 || Brewers || 9–6 || Wojciechowski (1–0) || Sparks || Mohler (2) || 7,026 || 9–10
|- bgcolor="ccffcc"
| 20 || April 24 || @ Blue Jays || 7–6 || Prieto (1–1) || Hentgen || Corsi (1) || 28,029 || 10–10
|- bgcolor="ccffcc"
| 21 || April 25 || @ Blue Jays || 4–3 (11) || Mohler (2–0) || Crabtree || — || 26,163 || 11–10
|- bgcolor="ffbbbb"
| 22 || April 26 || @ Tigers || 5–14 || Christopher || Johns (2–2) || — || 7,941 || 11–11
|- bgcolor="ccffcc"
| 23 || April 27 || @ Tigers || 4–1 || Reyes (3–3) || Lira || Taylor (1) || 13,067 || 12–11
|- bgcolor="ccffcc"
| 24 || April 28 || @ Tigers || 6–3 || Wojciechowski (2–0) || Gohr || Taylor (2) || 8,907 || 13–11
|- bgcolor="ffbbbb"
| 25 || April 30 || Angels || 3–7 || Langston || Prieto (1–2) || — || 7,154 || 13–12
|-

|- bgcolor="ffbbbb"
| 26 || May 1 || Angels || 4–6 || Boskie || Van Poppel (0–3) || Percival || 6,721 || 13–13
|- bgcolor="ffbbbb"
| 27 || May 2 || Angels || 1–3 || Abbott || Johns (2–3) || Percival || 9,102 || 13–14
|- bgcolor="ffbbbb"
| 28 || May 3 || @ Royals || 1–3 || Appier || Reyes (3–4) || Montgomery || 14,452 || 13–15
|- bgcolor="ccffcc"
| 29 || May 4 || @ Royals || 5–2 || Wojciechowski (3–0) || Gubicza || Groom (1) || 15,987 || 14–15
|- bgcolor="ffbbbb"
| 30 || May 5 || @ Royals || 0–2 || Haney || Prieto (1–3) || — || 16,589 || 14–16
|- bgcolor="ccffcc"
| 31 || May 6 || Indians || 5–3 || Taylor (1–0) || Assenmacher || Mohler (3) || 47,313 || 15–16
|- bgcolor="ccffcc"
| 32 || May 7 || Indians || 8–4 || Johns (3–3) || Hershiser || — || 10,126 || 16–16
|- bgcolor="ffbbbb"
| 33 || May 8 || Indians || 3–7 || Nagy || Reyes (3–5) || — || 9,288 || 16–17
|- bgcolor="ccffcc"
| 34 || May 10 || Twins || 15–5 || Wojciechowski (4–0) || Rodriguez || — || 8,278 || 17–17
|- bgcolor="ccffcc"
| 35 || May 11 || Twins || 12–5 || Prieto (2–3) || Radke || — || 15,791 || 18–17
|- bgcolor="ccffcc"
| 36 || May 12 || Twins || 8–3 || Wengert (1–1) || Parra || — || 13,430 || 19–17
|- bgcolor="ffbbbb"
| 37 || May 13 || Orioles || 3–4 || Krivda || Johns (3–4) || Myers || 8,204 || 19–18
|- bgcolor="ffbbbb"
| 38 || May 14 || Orioles || 1–9 || Mussina || Reyes (3–6) || — || 8,466 || 19–19
|- bgcolor="ffbbbb"
| 39 || May 17 || @ Red Sox || 3–5 (11) || Stanton || Van Poppel (0–4) || — || 28,690 || 19–20
|- bgcolor="ccffcc"
| 40 || May 18 || @ Red Sox || 6–5 (10) || Groom (2–0) || Garces || Taylor (3) || 31,663 || 20–20
|- bgcolor="ffbbbb"
| 41 || May 19 || @ Red Sox || 2–12 || Sele || Wengert (1–2) || — || 32,601 || 20–21
|- bgcolor="ffbbbb"
| 42 || May 20 || @ Red Sox || 4–16 || Gordon || Johns (3–5) || — || 20,890 || 20–22
|- bgcolor="ffbbbb"
| 43 || May 21 || @ Yankees || 3–7 || Gooden || Reyes (3–7) || — || 15,614 || 20–23
|- bgcolor="ccffcc"
| 44 || May 22 || @ Yankees || 5–1 || Wojciechowski (5–0) || Pettitte || Mohler (4) || 18,544 || 21–23
|- bgcolor="ffbbbb"
| 45 || May 23 || @ Yankees || 3–4 || Rogers || Taylor (1–1) || Wetteland || 19,315 || 21–24
|- bgcolor="ffbbbb"
| 46 || May 24 || @ Orioles || 4–5 (10) || McDowell || Reyes (3–8) || — || 45,024 || 21–25
|- bgcolor="ccffcc"
| 47 || May 25 || @ Orioles || 6–3 || Johns (4–5) || Wells || Groom (2) || 47,353 || 22–25
|- bgcolor="ffbbbb"
| 48 || May 26 || @ Orioles || 1–6 || Mercker || Chouinard (0–1) || McDowell || 47,401 || 22–26
|- bgcolor="ffbbbb"
| 49 || May 27 || Red Sox || 3–10 || Wakefield || Wojciechowski (5–1) || — || 21,688 || 22–27
|- bgcolor="ccffcc"
| 50 || May 28 || Red Sox || 6–2 || Wasdin (1–0) || Clemens || — || 9,338 || 23–27
|- bgcolor="ccffcc"
| 51 || May 29 || Red Sox || 7–6 (10) || Mohler (3–0) || Slocumb || — || 8,282 || 24–27
|- bgcolor="ffbbbb"
| 52 || May 31 || Yankees || 1–4 || Key || Johns (4–6) || Wetteland || 13,279 || 24–28
|-

|- bgcolor="ffbbbb"
| 53 || June 1 || Yankees || 3–6 || Pettitte || Chouinard (0–2) || Wetteland || 21,354 || 24–29
|- bgcolor="ffbbbb"
| 54 || June 2 || Yankees || 4–11 || Rogers || Wojciechowski (5–2) || Wetteland || 26,331 || 24–30
|- bgcolor="ccffcc"
| 55 || June 3 || Royals || 2–1 || Wasdin (2–0) || Appier || Taylor (4) || 6,465 || 25–30
|- bgcolor="ccffcc"
| 56 || June 4 || Royals || 8–3 || Wengert (2–2) || Gubicza || — || 11,524 || 26–30
|- bgcolor="ffbbbb"
| 57 || June 5 || Royals || 2–5 || Haney || Johns (4–7) || Montgomery || 8,113 || 26–31
|- bgcolor="ccffcc"
| 58 || June 7 || @ Twins || 6–4 || Reyes (4–8) || Radke || Corsi (2) || 14,999 || 27–31
|- bgcolor="ffbbbb"
| 59 || June 8 || @ Twins || 2–4 || Robertson || Wojciechowski (5–3) || Guardado || — || 27–32
|- bgcolor="ccffcc"
| 60 || June 8 || @ Twins || 13–7 || Wasdin (3–0) || Mahomes || — || 22,164 || 28–32
|- bgcolor="ffbbbb"
| 61 || June 9 || @ Twins || 3–5 || Rodriguez || Wengert (2–3) || — || 13,291 || 28–33
|- bgcolor="ffbbbb"
| 62 || June 10 || @ Indians || 4–5 || Nagy || Johns (4–8) || Mesa || 42,167 || 28–34
|- bgcolor="ffbbbb"
| 63 || June 11 || @ Indians || 5–6 (13) || Ogea || Reyes (4–9) || — || 42,249 || 28–35
|- bgcolor="ccffcc"
| 64 || June 12 || @ Indians || 9–6 || Montgomery (1–0) || McDowell || Mohler (5) || 40,673 || 29–35
|- bgcolor="ffbbbb"
| 65 || June 13 || @ Brewers || 3–16 || Karl || Wojciechowski (5–4) || — || 12,439 || 29–36
|- bgcolor="ffbbbb"
| 66 || June 14 || @ Brewers || 2–6 || Bones || Wasdin (3–1) || — || 14,404 || 29–37
|- bgcolor="ffbbbb"
| 67 || June 15 || @ Brewers || 9–12 || Givens || Wengert (2–4) || Garcia || 21,064 || 29–38
|- bgcolor="ccffcc"
| 68 || June 16 || @ Brewers || 10–9 || Taylor (2–1) || Fetters || Mohler (6) || 26,744 || 30–38
|- bgcolor="ccffcc"
| 69 || June 17 || @ Tigers || 8–4 (10) || Corsi (3–0) || Myers || — || 9,231 || 31–38
|- bgcolor="ccffcc"
| 70 || June 18 || @ Tigers || 8–5 || Van Poppel (1–4) || Urbani || Taylor (5) || 8,543 || 32–38
|- bgcolor="ccffcc"
| 71 || June 19 || @ Tigers || 10–3 || Wasdin (4–1) || Keagle || — || 9,875 || 33–38
|- bgcolor="ffbbbb"
| 72 || June 20 || Blue Jays || 0–1 || Hentgen || Wengert (2–5) || Timlin || 8,027 || 33–39
|- bgcolor="ffbbbb"
| 73 || June 21 || Blue Jays || 5–7 || Quantrill || Johns (4–9) || Timlin || 10,278 || 33–40
|- bgcolor="ccffcc"
| 74 || June 22 || Blue Jays || 8–4 || Chouinard (1–2) || Ware || — || 20,124 || 34–40
|- bgcolor="ffbbbb"
| 75 || June 23 || Blue Jays || 4–5 || Guzman || Wojciechowski (5–5) || Timlin || 14,407 || 34–41
|- bgcolor="ccffcc"
| 76 || June 24 || Tigers || 4–2 || Wasdin (5–1) || Sodowsky || Taylor (6) || 10,122 || 35–41
|- bgcolor="ffbbbb"
| 77 || June 25 || Tigers || 8–10 || Olivares || Wengert (2–6) || Olson || 9,652 || 35–42
|- bgcolor="ccffcc"
| 78 || June 27 || @ Angels || 18–2 || Johns (5–9) || Boskie || — || 23,503 || 36–42
|- bgcolor="ccffcc"
| 79 || June 28 || @ Angels || 6–3 || Chouinard (2–2) || Finley || — || 32,380 || 37–42
|- bgcolor="ccffcc"
| 80 || June 29 || @ Angels || 11–9 || Groom (3–0) || Monteleone || — || 26,565 || 38–42
|- bgcolor="ffbbbb"
| 81 || June 30 || @ Angels || 0–1 || Hancock || Wasdin (5–2) || Percival || 19,284 || 38–43
|-

|- bgcolor="ccffcc"
| 82 || July 1 || @ Mariners || 6–4 || Wengert (3–6) || Wagner || Taylor (7) || 18,166 || 39–43
|- bgcolor="ccffcc"
| 83 || July 2 || @ Mariners || 11–6 || Mohler (4–0) || Charlton || — || 19,632 || 40–43
|- bgcolor="ffbbbb"
| 84 || July 3 || @ Mariners || 3–4 || Ayala || Reyes (4–10) || — || 36,619 || 40–44
|- bgcolor="ccffcc"
| 85 || July 4 || Angels || 8–7 (11) || Taylor (3–1) || Monteleone || — || 14,144 || 41–44
|- bgcolor="ccffcc"
| 86 || July 5 || Angels || 16–8 || Wasdin (6–2) || Hancock || — || 36,129 || 42–44
|- bgcolor="ccffcc"
| 87 || July 6 || Angels || 6–5 (10) || Taylor (4–1) || James || — || 14,294 || 43–44
|- bgcolor="ffbbbb"
| 88 || July 7 || Angels || 4–9 || Boskie || Johns (5–10) || — || 16,526 || 43–45
|- bgcolor="ccffcc"
| 89 || July 11 || Rangers || 8–3 || Chouinard (3–2) || Oliver || — || 13,437 || 44–45
|- bgcolor="ffbbbb"
| 90 || July 12 || Rangers || 4–8 (10) || Russell || Taylor (4–2) || — || 12,074 || 44–46
|- bgcolor="ffbbbb"
| 91 || July 13 || Rangers || 1–8 || Pavlik || Wengert (3–7) || — || 16,792 || 44–47
|- bgcolor="ccffcc"
| 92 || July 14 || Rangers || 9–1 || Johns (6–10) || Gross || — || 20,704 || 45–47
|- bgcolor="ffbbbb"
| 93 || July 15 || Mariners || 1–5 || Wolcott || Telgheder (0–1) || — || 11,183 || 45–48
|- bgcolor="ccffcc"
| 94 || July 16 || Mariners || 12–5 || Chouinard (4–2) || Hitchcock || — || 15,206 || 46–48
|- bgcolor="ccffcc"
| 95 || July 17 || Mariners || 7–6 || Corsi (4–0) || Minor || Taylor (8) || 14,387 || 47–48
|- bgcolor="ccffcc"
| 96 || July 18 || @ Rangers || 5–4 (11) || Reyes (5–10) || Brandenburg || Van Poppel (1) || 28,585 || 48–48
|- bgcolor="ccffcc"
| 97 || July 19 || @ Rangers || 9–6 || Reyes (6–10) || Helling || Taylor (9) || 37,455 || 49–48
|- bgcolor="ffbbbb"
| 98 || July 20 || @ Rangers || 4–8 || Witt || Van Poppel (1–5) || — || 46,052 || 49–49
|- bgcolor="ccffcc"
| 99 || July 21 || @ Rangers || 11–8 || Groom (4–0) || Brandenburg || Mohler (7) || 36,039 || 50–49
|- bgcolor="ccffcc"
| 100 || July 22 || @ White Sox || 6–5 || Taylor (5–2) || Karchner || — || 23,572 || 51–49
|- bgcolor="ccffcc"
| 101 || July 23 || @ White Sox || 8–4 || Wengert (4–7) || Fernandez || Corsi (3) || 18,527 || 52–49
|- bgcolor="ccffcc"
| 102 || July 24 || @ White Sox || 6–5 || Corsi (5–0) || Simas || Taylor (10) || 23,350 || 53–49
|- bgcolor="ffbbbb"
| 103 || July 25 || @ Blue Jays || 3–4 || Crabtree || Witasick (0–1) || — || 30,174 || 53–50
|- bgcolor="ccffcc"
| 104 || July 26 || @ Blue Jays || 5–3 || Groom (5–0) || Castillo || Taylor (11) || 32,241 || 54–50
|- bgcolor="ffbbbb"
| 105 || July 27 || @ Blue Jays || 4–6 || Hanson || Wasdin (6–3) || Timlin || 32,162 || 54–51
|- bgcolor="ffbbbb"
| 106 || July 28 || @ Blue Jays || 0–1 || Hentgen || Prieto (2–4) || — || 31,150 || 54–52
|- bgcolor="ffbbbb"
| 107 || July 30 || White Sox || 1–2 || Baldwin || Telgheder (0–2) || Hernandez || 14,210 || 54–53
|- bgcolor="ccffcc"
| 108 || July 31 || White Sox || 5–4 || Witasick (1–1) || Karchner || Taylor (12) || 13,127 || 55–53
|-

|- bgcolor="ffbbbb"
| 109 || August 1 || White Sox || 3–8 || Tapani || Wasdin (6–4) || Hernandez || 10,514 || 55–54
|- bgcolor="ffbbbb"
| 110 || August 2 || Brewers || 3–4 (10) || Miranda || Taylor (5–3) || Fetters || 10,056 || 55–55
|- bgcolor="ffbbbb"
| 111 || August 3 || Brewers || 0–7 || Bones || Johns (6–11) || — || 15,171 || 55–56
|- bgcolor="ccffcc"
| 112 || August 4 || Brewers || 4–2 || Telgheder (1–2) || Van Egmond || Taylor (13) || 10,281 || 56–56
|- bgcolor="ffbbbb"
| 113 || August 5 || Brewers || 3–13 || Eldred || Adams (0–1) || — || 8,616 || 56–57
|- bgcolor="ffbbbb"
| 114 || August 6 || @ Royals || 2–9 || Belcher || Wasdin (6–5) || — || 14,028 || 56–58
|- bgcolor="ffbbbb"
| 115 || August 7 || @ Royals || 0–7 || Appier || Prieto (2–5) || — || 15,517 || 56–59
|- bgcolor="ccffcc"
| 116 || August 8 || @ Royals || 2–1 || Wengert (5–7) || Linton || Taylor (14) || 19,197 || 57–59
|- bgcolor="ffbbbb"
| 117 || August 9 || Indians || 4–10 || McDowell || Telgheder (1–3) || — || 20,122 || 57–60
|- bgcolor="ccffcc"
| 118 || August 10 || Indians || 5–1 || Adams (1–1) || Nagy || — || 30,238 || 58–60
|- bgcolor="ccffcc"
| 119 || August 11 || Indians || 9–3 || Wasdin (7–5) || Lopez || — || 21,914 || 59–60
|- bgcolor="ccffcc"
| 120 || August 12 || Twins || 11–1 || Prieto (3–5) || Robertson || — || 10,071 || 60–60
|- bgcolor="ffbbbb"
| 121 || August 13 || Twins || 2–6 || Aguilera || Wengert (5–8) || — || 11,156 || 60–61
|- bgcolor="ffbbbb"
| 122 || August 14 || Twins || 7–13 || Rodriguez || Telgheder (1–4) || — || 12,729 || 60–62
|- bgcolor="ffbbbb"
| 123 || August 15 || Orioles || 5–18 || Mussina || Adams (1–2) || — || 14,026 || 60–63
|- bgcolor="ffbbbb"
| 124 || August 16 || Orioles || 3–14 || Erickson || Wasdin (7–6) || — || — || 60–64
|- bgcolor="ffbbbb"
| 125 || August 16 || Orioles || 4–5 (10) || Myers || Mohler (4–1) || — || 15,645 || 60–65
|- bgcolor="ccffcc"
| 126 || August 17 || Orioles || 3–1 || Prieto (4–5) || Coppinger || Acre (1) || 20,231 || 61–65
|- bgcolor="ccffcc"
| 127 || August 18 || Orioles || 9–6 || Wengert (6–8) || Wells || — || 18,122 || 62–65
|- bgcolor="ffbbbb"
| 128 || August 20 || @ Red Sox || 3–4 || Garces || Mohler (4–2) || Slocumb || 25,094 || 62–66
|- bgcolor="ffbbbb"
| 129 || August 21 || @ Red Sox || 4–6 || Brandenburg || Johns (6–12) || Slocumb || 26,362 || 62–67
|- bgcolor="ffbbbb"
| 130 || August 22 || @ Red Sox || 1–2 || Clemens || Acre (0–1) || — || 30,503 || 62–68
|- bgcolor="ffbbbb"
| 131 || August 23 || @ Yankees || 3–5 || Gooden || Wengert (6–9) || Rivera || 34,244 || 62–69
|- bgcolor="ffbbbb"
| 132 || August 24 || @ Yankees || 4–5 || Whitehurst || Telgheder (1–5) || Pavlas || 32,125 || 62–70
|- bgcolor="ccffcc"
| 133 || August 25 || @ Yankees || 6–4 || Mohler (5–2) || Nelson || Acre (2) || 50,808 || 63–70
|- bgcolor="ffbbbb"
| 134 || August 26 || @ Orioles || 11–12 (10) || Myers || Acre (0–2) || — || 43,361 || 63–71
|- bgcolor="ffbbbb"
| 135 || August 27 || @ Orioles || 1–3 || Wells || Prieto (4–6) || Myers || 43,641 || 63–72
|- bgcolor="ccffcc"
| 136 || August 28 || @ Orioles || 3–0 || Wengert (7–9) || Mussina || — || 45,282 || 64–72
|- bgcolor="ccffcc"
| 137 || August 30 || Red Sox || 7–0 || Telgheder (2–5) || Maddux || — || 17,182 || 65–72
|- bgcolor="ccffcc"
| 138 || August 31 || Red Sox || 8–0 || Adams (2–2) || Wakefield || — || 32,116 || 66–72
|-

|- bgcolor="ffbbbb"
| 139 || September 1 || Red Sox || 3–8 || Sele || Wasdin (7–7) || — || 15,021 || 66–73
|- bgcolor="ffbbbb"
| 140 || September 2 || Yankees || 0–5 || Cone || Prieto (4–7) || — || 20,159 || 66–74
|- bgcolor="ccffcc"
| 141 || September 3 || Yankees || 10–9 || Acre (1–2) || Boehringer || Johns (1) || 11,621 || 67–74
|- bgcolor="ffbbbb"
| 142 || September 4 || Yankees || 3–10 || Pettitte || Telgheder (2–6) || — || 9,892 || 67–75
|- bgcolor="ccffcc"
| 143 || September 6 || Royals || 7–1 || Adams (3–2) || Haney || — || 14,404 || 68–75
|- bgcolor="ccffcc"
| 144 || September 7 || Royals || 13–6 || Prieto (5–7) || Belcher || — || 13,175 || 69–75
|- bgcolor="ccffcc"
| 145 || September 8 || Royals || 8–7 (10) || Corsi (6–0) || Pichardo || — || 17,208 || 70–75
|- bgcolor="ccffcc"
| 146 || September 10 || @ Twins || 7–0 || Telgheder (3–6) || Robertson || — || 9,676 || 71–75
|- bgcolor="ffbbbb"
| 147 || September 11 || @ Twins || 2–7 || Radke || Adams (3–3) || — || 9,493 || 71–76
|- bgcolor="ffbbbb"
| 148 || September 12 || @ Twins || 3–4 (12) || Stevens || Mohler (5–3) || — || 9,712 || 71–77
|- bgcolor="ffbbbb"
| 149 || September 14 || @ Indians || 2–9 || Nagy || Wengert (7–10) || — || — || 71–78
|- bgcolor="ffbbbb"
| 150 || September 14 || @ Indians || 8–9 || Plunk || Small (0–2) || Mesa || 42,233 || 71–79
|- bgcolor="ccffcc"
| 151 || September 15 || @ Indians || 10–9 (10) || Reyes (7–10) || Mesa || — || 42,226 || 72–79
|- bgcolor="ccffcc"
| 152 || September 17 || @ Angels || 5–1 || Prieto (6–7) || Springer || — || 17,827 || 73–79
|- bgcolor="ffbbbb"
| 153 || September 18 || @ Angels || 1–3 || Finley || Adams (3–4) || Percival || 18,213 || 73–80
|- bgcolor="ffbbbb"
| 154 || September 20 || @ Mariners || 2–12 || Carmona || Wengert (7–11) || Meacham || 56,535 || 73–81
|- bgcolor="ffbbbb"
| 155 || September 21 || @ Mariners || 2–9 || Moyer || Telgheder (3–7) || — || 56,103 || 73–82
|- bgcolor="ccffcc"
| 156 || September 22 || @ Mariners || 13–11 || Mohler (6–3) || Mulholland || Taylor (15) || 54,194 || 74–82
|- bgcolor="ccffcc"
| 157 || September 23 || Rangers || 5–3 || Wasdin (8–7) || Witt || Taylor (16) || 10,164 || 75–82
|- bgcolor="ffbbbb"
| 158 || September 24 || Rangers || 3–7 || Cook || Small (0–3) || — || 9,694 || 75–83
|- bgcolor="ccffcc"
| 159 || September 26 || Mariners || 7–5 || Taylor (6–3) || Charlton || — || 11,141 || 76–83
|- bgcolor="ccffcc"
| 160 || September 27 || Mariners || 8–1 || Telgheder (4–7) || Mulholland || — || 25,132 || 77–83
|- bgcolor="ffbbbb"
| 161 || September 28 || Mariners || 3–5 (10) || Carmona || Acre (1–3) || Charlton || 30,057 || 77–84
|- bgcolor="ccffcc"
| 162 || September 29 || Mariners || 3–1 || Small (1–3) || Torres || Taylor (17) || 34,462 || 78–84
|-

|-
| Legend:       = Win       = LossBold = Athletics team member

Detailed records

Transactions
June 4, 1996: Eric Chavez was drafted by the Oakland Athletics in the 1st round (10th overall) of the 1996 amateur draft. Signed August 27, 1996.
June 4, 1996: A. J. Hinch was drafted by the Oakland Athletics in the 3rd round of the 1996 amateur draft. Signed June 22, 1996.

Roster

Player stats

Batting

Starters by position 
Note: Pos = Position; G = Games played; AB = At bats; H = Hits; Avg. = Batting average; HR = Home runs; RBI = Runs batted in

Other batters 
Note: G = Games played; AB = At bats; H = Hits; Avg. = Batting average; HR = Home runs; RBI = Runs batted in

Pitching

Starting pitchers 
Note: G = Games pitched; IP = Innings pitched; W = Wins; L = Losses; ERA = Earned run average; SO = Strikeouts

Other pitchers 
Note: G = Games pitched; IP = Innings pitched; W = Wins; L = Losses; ERA = Earned run average; SO = Strikeouts

Relief pitchers 
Note: G = Games pitched; W = Wins; L = Losses; SV = Saves; ERA = Earned run average; SO = Strikeouts

Awards and records
 Mark McGwire, Silver Slugger Award
 Mark McGwire, Major League record, 1st player to reach 50 Home Runs in one season before reaching 400 at-bats in a season

Farm system 

LEAGUE CHAMPIONS: Edmonton, West Michigan

References

1996 Oakland Athletics at Baseball Reference
1996 Oakland Athletics at Baseball Almanac

Oakland Athletics seasons
Oakland Athletics season
Oak